Aerosur can refer to:
AeroSur, a Bolivian airline
AeroSur (Colombia), a Colombian cargo airline
AeroSur Paraguay, a failed Paraguayan airline